The men's team road race cycling event at the 1948 Olympic Games took place on 13 August and was one of six events at the 1948 Olympics. Teams had four riders and the team time taken as sum of the team's three best finishers.

The race was won by the Belgian team. However, the Belgian cyclists were not aware that there was a team competition, and returned to Belgium, missing the medal ceremony. Only in 2010 did they receive their medals.

Results

Final

References

Road cycling at the 1948 Summer Olympics
Cycling at the Summer Olympics – Men's team road race